Andrew John Trevor Brown (27 June 1935 – 16 June 2020) was a Scottish cricketer and  Royal Navy Engineering Officer.  Brown was a left-handed batsman who bowled right-arm off break.  He was born in Edinburgh.

The son of John Brown and Nesta Jones, Brown was educated at Sherborne School in Dorset, where he represented the school cricket team.  Following the end of his education, he joined the Royal Navy whom he also played cricket for.  Brown made his debut for Devon in the 1959 Minor Counties Championship against the Somerset Second XI.  From 1959 to 1961, he represented the county in ten Championship matches, the last of which came against Cornwall.

Andrew Brown played two first-class matches for the Combined Services in 1961, against Cambridge University and the touring South Africans.  In his two first-class matches he scored 41 runs at a batting average of 13.66, with a high score of 40* against Cambridge University.

Latterly, he played for Aberdeenshire from 1970 to 1974 and was Captain in 1973.

Following his retirement from the Royal Navy, Brown became an HR manager, and subsequently Director of Training at Brathay Hall, Cumbria.  Married twice, Brown had three children. Latterly he lived in Banchory on Royal Deeside, and in his sixties coached junior cricketers at Banchory CC. He became a member of Durham CC to watch county cricket as well as local Aberdeenshire matches.

References

External links
Andrew Brown at ESPNcricinfo
Andrew Brown at CricketArchive

1935 births
2020 deaths
Cricketers from Edinburgh
People educated at Sherborne School
Scottish cricketers
Devon cricketers
Combined Services cricketers
Royal Navy sailors